Orsomarso Sportivo Clube is a Colombian professional football team based in Palmira. Founded in 2012, the club currently competes in the Categoría Primera B, and plays its home games at the Francisco Rivera Escobar stadium. Its name comes from the Italian comune Orsomarso.

History
Orsomarso S.C. was founded on 7 December 2012 on the initiative of José Gabriel Sangiovanni, whose father José "Pepino" Sangiovanni (born in Orsomarso, Italy) and brother Oreste had also been linked to football as both served as chairmen of América de Cali. The club was originally created as a football academy based in the village of El Carmelo in Candelaria, Valle del Cauca, aiming to help young footballers with limited economic resources start a professional footballing career. By July, Orsomarso already had an under-17 squad, under-19 squad, and a senior team which entered the amateur league of the Valle del Cauca Department (Copa El País), whilst the youth teams joined the youth championships organized by the Colombian Football Federation.

In January 2016, Orsomarso turned into a professional football club after its owners bought the affiliation rights (ficha) that belonged to Uniautónoma, club that was dissolved at the conclusion of the 2015 season and joined Categoría Primera B for the 2016 season. The club played its first professional match on 10 February 2016 against América de Cali, which was valid for the Copa Colombia and ended in a 2–0 defeat, while its first league match was a 2–0 away victory over Unión Magdalena four days later.

Players

First-team squad

References

External links
Official website – archived 
Orsomarso S.C. at Soccerway

Football clubs in Colombia
Association football clubs established in 2016
2016 establishments in Colombia